Zang Tianshuo (6 March 1964 – 28 September 2018) was a Chinese rock musician.

Biography
Zang Tianshuo began his musical career with the band 1989, formed with his childhood friends Qin Yong, Qin Qi and Li Li, and they incorpored American Chinese singers Jin Dayou and Lu Jisheng into the band's line up.

Zang died of liver cancer in Beijing on 28 September 2018 at the age of 54.

Discography
 1995 My Last Ten Years (我这十年, Wo zhe shi nian)
 1996 Xīn hái zài děnghòu
 1998 Pěng chū zìjǐ

References

1964 births
2018 deaths
20th-century Chinese male singers
Chinese rock musicians
Chinese rock singers
Chinese male singer-songwriters
Deaths from liver cancer
Deaths from cancer in the People's Republic of China
Musicians from Beijing
21st-century Chinese male singers
Manchu singers